Pachypeza marginata is a species of beetle in the family Cerambycidae. It was described by Pascoe 1888.

References

Agapanthiini
Beetles described in 1888